Bilsborrow  is a village on the A6 road and the Lancaster Canal, in the Wyre District, in the English county of Lancashire. The village population at the 2011 census was 632. Bilsborrow was a civil parish until 2003 when it merged with the neighbouring parish of Myerscough to form the parish of Myerscough and Bilsborrow.

Bilsborrow has a primary school, a post office and local shop, and a fish and chip shop, St Hilda's Church of England church and two public houses, the Roebuck and the White Bull, a canalside tavern Owd Nell's Tavern, a Premier Inn hotel, a canalside lodge, a guest house, and a themed thatched hamlet 'village' with restaurant, hotel and tavern.

In 2018, John Cross Church of England Primary School celebrated the 300th anniversary of its founding by John Cross, a local Christian benefactor.

In the former parish is the hamlet of Duncombe. In the 1950s there was a large paper mill at Matshead. The River Brock is crossed by Walmesley Bridge; it is dated 1883 but looks much older.

References 

Philip's Street Atlas; p. 159

External links

Villages in Lancashire
Geography of the Borough of Wyre